Clint Evans (born 9 April 1961) is an ocean rower and winner of the 2005 Atlantic Rowing Race with his partner Chris Andrews in their boat C2 – the first British crew to win the Atlantic Rowing Race..

Evans is a strategy and business performance consultant, mentor and coach.  He is the former Chief Executive Officer of Barlow Lyde & Gilbert – an international law firm, Director of Brand and Talent at major law firm Reynolds Porter Chamberlain, and a former Director at Henley Management College. He was educated at Emanuel School in Battersea, London and rowed for Great Britain at U23 Level and for Wales. He is the owner and Managing Director of SOS Consulting.

References

External links
 
  Four months of rowing later. 7 December 2011. World Rowing.
 

English male rowers
Ocean rowers
Living people
People educated at Emanuel School
1961 births
Place of birth missing (living people)